Old Norwegian ( and ), also called Norwegian Norse, is an early form of the Norwegian language that was spoken between the 11th and 14th century; it is a transitional stage between Old West Norse and Middle Norwegian, and also Old Norn and Old Faroese.

Its distinction from Old West Norse is a matter of convention. Traditionally, Old Norwegian has been divided into the main dialect areas of North Western, Outer South Western, Inner South Western, North Eastern, and South Eastern.

Phonological and morphological features
One of the most important early differences between Old Norwegian and Old Icelandic is that h in the consonant combinations hl-, hn- and hr- was lost in Old Norwegian around the 11th century, while being preserved in Old Icelandic. Thus, one has e.g.

Many Old Norwegian dialects feature a height based system of vowel harmony: Following stressed high vowels and diphthongs, the unstressed vowels  and  appear as i, u, while they are represented as e, o following long non-high vowels. The situation following stressed short non-high vowels is much debated and was apparently different in the individual dialects.

The u-umlaut of short  (written ǫ in normalized Old Norse) is not as consistently graphically distinguished from non-umlauted  as in Old Icelandic, especially in writings from the Eastern dialect areas. It is still a matter of academic debate whether this is to be interpreted phonologically as a lack of umlaut or merely as a lack of its graphical representation.

Old Norwegian had alternative dual and plural first person pronouns, mit, mér, to the Common Norse vit, vér.''

Old Norn

Norn is an extinct language derived from the North Germanic language family that died out in the late 19th or 20th century. It was primarily spoken in the Northern Isles, or Orkney (Orkneyjar) and Shetland (Hjaltland), and Caithness on the northern tip of Scotland. Little remains of Norn other than a few literary works in Orkney Norn and Shetland Norn, while Caithness Norn is expected to have died out in the 15th century, replaced by Scots.

Sources from the 17th and 18th century report that Norn, often misidentified as Danish, Norse or Norwegian, was in a rapid decline, although prevailing in Shetland more than Orkney. Walter Sutherland is generally considered the last native speaker of the language, dying in 1850, though many claims describe the language, probably in verses and songs, spoken in the islands of Foula and Unst as late as the 20th century.

Old Faroese

Middle Norwegian

The Black Death struck Norway in 1349, killing over 60% of the population. This probably precipitated the current process of language development. The language in Norway after 1350 up to about 1550 is generally referred to as Middle Norwegian. The language went through several changes: morphological paradigms were simplified, including the loss of grammatical cases and the levelling of personal inflection on verbs. A vowel reduction also took place, in some dialects, including in parts of Norway, reducing many final unstressed vowels in a word to a common "e".

The phonemic inventory also underwent changes. The dental fricatives represented by the letters þ and ð disappeared from the Norwegian language, either merging with their equivalent stop consonants, represented by t and d, respectively, or being lost altogether.

See also
 Norwegian language
 Icelandic language
 Faroese language
 Norn language

References

External links
 «Kulturformidlingen norrøne tekster og kvad» Norway.
 «Medieval Nordic Text Archive» Organization working with Medieval Nordic texts.
 «Dokumentasjonsprosjektet» Includes old Norse dictionary and includes Diplomatarium Norvegicum which is a collection of texts from before 1570 (originally 22 books with 19 000 documents) and Regesta Norvegica which contains letters and official documents (it's a more detailed description on "Om Regesta Norvegica") from 822 to 1390. This page is partly available in English. (not Regesta Norvegica)
 Old Norwegian online dictionary

Norwegian, Old
Norwegian language
Norwegian
Norwegian manuscripts
Languages attested from the 11th century